Del Parque is a former train station in Buenos Aires, Argentina. It was the first railway station in the country, serving as terminus of Buenos Aires Western Railway. The station was located at the intersection of Cerrito and Tucumán streets.

Del Parque operated for over 27 years until it was closed due to the high pedestrian traffic in the area where the station was located. Long distance services to the cities of Bragado and Lobos departed from the station.

History

In 1854 the province of Buenos Aires granted concession to local consortium "Sociedad Camino de Hierro de Buenos Aires al Oeste" to build the first railway line in Argentina, starting in Buenos Aires. After several projects were studied, it was decided that the terminal station would be built in front of the "Plaza del Parque" (currently Plaza Lavalle) that stayed closer to the Argentine Army Artillery Park.

The station building was placed on the block around Cerrito, Tucumán, Libertad and Viamonte streets, which was a low-traffic area at the time. After several attempts, the train finally made its inaugural trip on 29 August 1857 from the Parque station, carrying notable people of the time such as Valentín Alsina, Bartolomé Mitre, Domingo Sarmiento and Dalmacio Vélez Sársfield. After a brief stop at San José de Flores, the train arrived at Floresta, the terminal station of the line.

Del Parque station was opened to the public on the following day, running two trains per day, with the night service depending on moonlight to operate. Two classes were available, first class (at a cost of AR$10) and second class (AR$5). From the time of its opening onwards, the railway line increased its number of passengers.

In 1873 the Government considered moving the terminus to Once (the first stop after Del Parque) due to the growing population in the area between both stations. Rail tracks crossed along streets and avenues (such as Corrientes) with high vehicle and pedestrians traffic. In April 1878 the Municipality of Buenos Aires promulgated by decree the moving of the station to Once, also closing the Once–Del Parque section, though it did not take effect until 1883. In 1884 the Del Parque building became the  Argentine Army's headquarters.

The new Once building was inaugurated in 1883, also made of wood but bigger than the previous one. Nevertheless, it would be replaced by the current building in 1890 due to the increasing traffic.

On September 13, 1886, the Buenos Aires Legislature promulgated the demolition of the building to build the new Teatro Colón. Works began in April 1890 and the theatre would be inaugurated in 1908.

Gallery

Bibliography

References

Railway stations in Buenos Aires
Demolished buildings and structures in Argentina
Railway stations opened in 1857
Railway stations closed in 1883
1857 establishments in Argentina
1883 disestablishments
Defunct railway stations in Argentina